Michael Haydn's Symphony No. 41 in A major, Perger 33, Sherman 41, MH 508, written in Salzburg in 1789, is the last symphony he wrote (he lived for 17 more years).

The symphony is scored for 2 oboes, 2 bassoons, 2 horns, and strings. It is in three movements:

Spiritoso
Andante, in D major
Fugato. Vivace molto.

The last movement is a vigorous fugato, something this work has in common with Wolfgang Amadeus Mozart's Symphony No. 41 in C major.

Discography

This symphony has been recorded on LP by the Little Orchestra of London and the RIAS-Sinfonietta Berlin.

References

 Charles H. Sherman and T. Donley Thomas, Johann Michael Haydn (1737 - 1806), a chronological thematic catalogue of his works. Stuyvesant, New York: Pendragon Press (1993)
 C. Sherman, "Johann Michael Haydn" in The Symphony: Salzburg, Part 2 London: Garland Publishing (1982): lxviii

Symphony 41
Compositions in A major
1789 compositions